The World's Billionaires 2015 edition was the 29th annual ranking of The World's Billionaires by Forbes magazine.  The list estimated the net worth of the world's richest people. The new list was released online on March 2, 2015. As of 2015, Bill Gates had been placed at the top of this list 16 times.

Annual list 
Bill Gates was again named the richest person in the world in Forbes Magazine's annual list of the world's billionaires. This is the 16th time that the founder of Microsoft has claimed the top spot. Carlos Slim, Mexican business magnate, came in second as he had in 2014. Warren Buffett of Berkshire Hathaway placed third while the founder of Zara, Amancio Ortega of Spain, slipped down a position from last year to number four. Larry Ellison, the founder of Oracle rounded off the top five. Christy Walton was the highest ranking female at number eight. America's Evan Spiegel, co-founder of photo messaging app Snapchat, became the youngest billionaire this year at the age of 24. At age 99, David Rockefeller maintained his position as the oldest billionaire to make the list.

In the 29th annual list of global billionaires, ist.cord 1,826 billionaires were named with an aggregated net worth of $7.05 trillion, up from $6.4 trillion in 2014. 46 of the billionaires on the list are under the age of 40. A record number of 290 people joined the list for the first time, of whom 25% hail from China, which produced a world-leading 71 newcomers. The United States came in second, with 57, followed by India, with 28, and Germany, with 23. Mark Zuckerberg, the social media magnate and founder of Facebook, was placed at number 16 with $33.4 billion. Self-made billionaires made up the largest number of people on the list with 1,191 positions while just 230 came into their wealth through inheritance. The number of billionaires who inherited a portion but are still working to increase their fortunes is 405.

The United States has the largest number of billionaires. The number of Russian billionaires declined the most; being down to 76 billionaires from 111 of 2014. Russia is now placed behind China, Germany and India. Iceland again has a billionaire in the list after a gap of five years with the entry of Björgólfur Thor Björgólfsson. Guatemala has a billionaire, Mario Lopez Estrada, for the first time in history.

Monarchs and other royalty are not included in the list.

Wealth rankings

Top 100

See also
 List of wealthiest families

 The World's Billionaires 2014

References

Forbes lists
Lists of people by magazine appearance
2015 in economics